The 2002 Chicago White Sox season was the White Sox's 103rd season, and their 102nd in Major League Baseball. They finished with a record of 81-81, good enough for 2nd place in the American League Central, 13.5 games behind the champion Minnesota Twins.

Offseason 
February 1, 2002: Kenny Lofton signed as a free agent with the Chicago White Sox.

Regular season 
 On May 2, 2002, Mike Cameron of the Mariners hit four home runs in one game versus the White Sox.
 On July 2, the Tigers and White Sox set a Major League Baseball record by combining to hit for 12 home runs in one game. The box score for the home runs is as follows:
 Detroit Young 2 (7,1st inning off Ritchie 0 on, 2 out, 9th inning off Howry 0 on, 2 out); Fick (11,1st inning off Ritchie 1 on, 2 out); Lombard (1,7th inning off Ritchie 0 on, 1 out); Magee (6,9th inning off Howry 0 on, 0 out); Easley (4,9th inning off Howry 1 on).
 Chicago Lofton (4,1st inning off Bernero 0 on, 0 out); Ordonez 2 (15,1st inning off Bernero 0 on, 2 out, 8th inning off Paniagua 3 on, 1 out); Valentin (11,2nd inning off Bernero 0 on, 0 out); Alomar 2 (6,4th inning off Bernero 0 on, 2 out, 6th inning off Lima 0 on).

Season standings

American League Wild Card

Record vs. opponents

Opening Day lineup 
 Kenny Lofton, CF
 Ray Durham, 2B
 Frank Thomas, DH
 Magglio Ordóñez, RF
 Paul Konerko, 1B
 José Valentín, 3B
 Carlos Lee, LF
 Sandy Alomar Jr., C
 Royce Clayton, SS
 Mark Buehrle, P

Notable transactions 
 May 16, 2002: Brooks Kieschnick was signed as a free agent with the Chicago White Sox.
 July 25, 2002: Ray Durham was traded by the Chicago White Sox with cash to the Oakland Athletics for Jon Adkins.
 July 28, 2002: Kenny Lofton was traded by the Chicago White Sox to the San Francisco Giants for Felix Diaz and Ryan Meaux (minors).
 July 29, 2002: Sandy Alomar Jr. was traded by the Chicago White Sox to the Colorado Rockies for Enemencio Pacheco (minors).

Roster

Game log 

|- style="text-align:center;background-color:#bbffbb"
| 1 || April 1 || @ Mariners || 6–5 || Buehrle (1–0) || García (0–1) || Foulke (1) || 3:18 || 46,036 || 1–0 || box
|- style="text-align:center;background-color:#ffbbbb"
| 2 || April 2 || @ Mariners || 4–7 || Rhodes (1–0) || Barceló (0–1) || Sasaki (1) || 3:03 || 40,805 || 1–1 || box
|- style="text-align:center;background-color:#ffbbbb"
| 3 || April 3 || @ Mariners || 6–7 || Franklin (1–0) || Foulke (0–1) || || 2:50 || 31,082 || 1–2 || box
|- style="text-align:center;background-color:#ffbbbb"
| 4 || April 5 || @ Royals || 2–5 || Byrd (1–0) || Garland (0–1) || Stein (1) || 2:50 || 15,975 || 1–3 || box
|- style="text-align:center;background-color:#bbffbb"
| 5 || April 6 || @ Royals || 14–0 || Buehrle (2–0) || Durbin (0–1) || || 2:49 || 15,178 || 2–3 || box
|- style="text-align:center;background-color:#ffbbbb"
| 6 || April 7 || @ Royals || 2–9 || Suppan (1–0) || Ritchie (0–1) || || 2:47 || 10,788 || 2–4 || box
|- style="text-align:center;background-color:#bbbbbb"
| – || April 8 || @ Tigers ||colspan=8| Postponed (rain), rescheduled for July 13
|- style="text-align:center;background-color:#bbffbb"
| 7 || April 9 || @ Tigers || 8–2 || Wright (1–0) || Sparks (0–1) || || 2:34 || 11,833 || 3–4 || box
|- style="text-align:center;background-color:#bbffbb"
| 8 || April 10 || @ Tigers || 7–5 || Osuna (1–0) || Lima (0–2) || Foulke (2) || 2:49 || 14,155 || 4–4 || box
|- style="text-align:center;background-color:#bbffbb"
| 9 || April 12 || Orioles || 5–2 || Buehrle (3–0) || Towers (0–2) || Foulke (3) || 2:24 || 41,128 || 5–4 || box
|- style="text-align:center;background-color:#bbffbb"
| 10 || April 13 || Orioles || 4–3 || Osuna (2–0) || Roberts (0–1) || Foulke (4) || 2:36 || 19,201 || 6–4 || box
|- style="text-align:center;background-color:#ffbbbb"
| 11 || April 14 || Orioles || 4–9 || Maduro (1–1) || Wright (1–1) || || 2:55 || 23,951 || 6–5 || box
|- style="text-align:center;background-color:#bbffbb"
| 12 || April 15 || Orioles || 13–4 || Garland (1–1) || Johnson (0–3) || || 2:41 || 15,794 || 7–5 || box
|- style="text-align:center;background-color:#bbffbb"
| 13 || April 16 || Indians || 10–5 || Marte (1–0) || Finley (1–1) || || 2:55 || 23,502 || 8–5 || box
|- style="text-align:center;background-color:#bbffbb"
| 14 || April 17 || Indians || 7–2 || Buehrle (4–0) || Báez (2–1) || || 2:35 || 15,561 || 9–5 || box
|- style="text-align:center;background-color:#bbffbb"
| 15 || April 18 || Indians || 7–1 || Ritchie (1–1) || Colón (3–1) || || 2:55 || 13,880 || 10–5 || box
|- style="text-align:center;background-color:#ffbbbb"
| 16 || April 19 || Tigers || 2–8 || Sparks (1–1) || Wright (1–2) || || 2:42 || 13,917 || 10–6 || box
|- style="text-align:center;background-color:#bbffbb"
| 17 || April 20 || Tigers || 12–5 || Garland (2–1) || Cornejo (0–2) || || 2:51 || 15,737 || 11–6 || box
|- style="text-align:center;background-color:#bbffbb"
| 18 || April 21 || Tigers || 11–8 || Osuna (3–0) || Paniagua (0–1) || Foulke (5) || 3:08 || 13,619 || 12–6 || box
|- style="text-align:center;background-color:#ffbbbb"
| 19 || April 22 || @ Indians || 2–4 || Báez (3–1) || Buehrle (4–1) || Wickman (6) || 2:35 || 24,519 || 12–7 || box
|- style="text-align:center;background-color:#bbffbb"
| 20 || April 23 || @ Indians || 5–1 || Ritchie (2–1) || Colón (3–2) || || 2:53 || 25,284 || 13–7 || box
|- style="text-align:center;background-color:#bbffbb"
| 21 || April 24 || @ Indians || 9–2 || Wright (2–2) || Sabathia (2–2) || || 3:04 || 25,935 || 14–7 || box
|- style="text-align:center;background-color:#bbffbb"
| 22 || April 25 || @ Indians || 6–3 || Garland (3–1) || Drese (2–2) || Foulke (6) || 3:07 || 29,046 || 15–7 || box
|- style="text-align:center;background-color:#ffbbbb"
| 23 || April 26 || @ Athletics || 4–6 || Lidle (1–3) || Parque (0–1) || Koch (5) || 2:52 || 10,129 || 15–8 || box
|- style="text-align:center;background-color:#ffbbbb"
| 24 || April 27 || @ Athletics || 1–16 || Fyhrie (1–1) || Buehrle (4–2) || || 2:42 || 26,111 || 15–9 || box
|- style="text-align:center;background-color:#ffbbbb"
| 25 || April 28 || @ Athletics || 0–10 || Hudson (3–2) || Ritchie (2–2) || || 2:37 || 20,365 || 15–10 || box
|- style="text-align:center;background-color:#bbffbb"
| 26 || April 30 || Mariners || 8–4 || Wright (3–2) || Abbott (1–3) || || 2:41 || 16,253 || 16–10 || box

|- style="text-align:center;background-color:#bbffbb"
| 27 || May 1 || Mariners || 9 – 2 (8) || Garland (4–1) || Franklin (2–1) || Glover (1) || 2:50 || 12,735 || 17–10 || box
|- style="text-align:center;background-color:#ffbbbb"
| 28 || May 2 || Mariners || 4–15 || Baldwin (3–1) || Rauch (0–1) || || 3:00 || 12,891 || 17–11 || box
|- style="text-align:center;background-color:#bbffbb"
| 29 || May 3 || Athletics || 6–1 || Buehrle (5–2) || Fyhrie (1–2) || || 2:39 || 15,746 || 18–11 || box
|- style="text-align:center;background-color:#bbffbb"
| 30 || May 4 || Athletics || 10–2 || Ritchie (3–2) || Hudson (3–3) || || 2:59 || 27,511 || 19–11 || box
|- style="text-align:center;background-color:#ffbbbb"
| 31 || May 5 || Athletics || 2–3 || Zito (2–2) || Wright (3–3) || Koch (7) || 2:42 || 27,275 || 19–12 || box
|- style="text-align:center;background-color:#ffbbbb"
| 32 || May 6 || @ Rangers || 5–6 || Irabu (1–2) || Osuna (3–1) || || 3:18 || 24,609 || 19–13 || box
|- style="text-align:center;background-color:#bbffbb"
| 33 || May 7 || @ Rangers || 11–6 || Porzio (1–0) || Bell (2–1) || Ginter (1) || 3:00 || 20,108 || 20–13 || box
|- style="text-align:center;background-color:#bbffbb"
| 34 || May 8 || @ Rangers || 5–3 || Buehrle (6–2) || Davis (3–3) || || 2:49 || 21,305 || 21–13 || box
|- style="text-align:center;background-color:#ffbbbb"
| 35 || May 9 || @ Rangers || 1–4 || Benoit (1–0) || Ritchie (3–3) || Irabu (8) || 2:47 || 32,962 || 21–14 || box
|- style="text-align:center;background-color:#ffbbbb"
| 36 || May 10 || @ Angels || 0–19 || Schoeneweis (2–4) || Wright (3–4) || || 2:48 || 36,715 || 21–15 || box
|- style="text-align:center;background-color:#ffbbbb"
| 37 || May 11 || @ Angels || 3–6 || Ortiz (4–3) || Garland (4–2) || Percival (6) || 2:49 || 40,535 || 21–16 || box
|- style="text-align:center;background-color:#ffbbbb"
| 38 || May 12 || @ Angels || 4–5 || Percival (2–1) || Foulke (0–2) || || 3:26 || 19,251 || 21–17 || box
|- style="text-align:center;background-color:#bbffbb"
| 39 || May 14 || Rangers || 15–4 || Buehrle (7–2) || Davis (3–4) || || 3:07 || 17,503 || 22–17 || box
|- style="text-align:center;background-color:#ffbbbb"
| 40 || May 15 || Rangers || 2–5 || Valdez (3–4) || Ritchie (3–4) || Irabu (10) || 2:47 || 13,980 || 22–18 || box
|- style="text-align:center;background-color:#bbffbb"
| 41 || May 16 || Rangers || 4–0 || Wright (4–4) || Rogers (4–2) || || 2:16 || 13,119 || 23–18 || box
|- style="text-align:center;background-color:#ffbbbb"
| 42 || May 17 || Angels || 4–8 || Schoeneweis (3–4) || Garland (4–3) || Levine (4) || 2:56 || 12,736 || 23–19 || box
|- style="text-align:center;background-color:#bbffbb"
| 43 || May 18 || Angels || 10–4 || Glover (1–0) || Ortiz (4–4) || || 3:08 || 21,122 || 24–19 || box
|- style="text-align:center;background-color:#ffbbbb"
| 44 || May 19 || Angels || 1–6 || Washburn (4–2) || Buehrle (7–3) || || 2:13 || 19,869 || 24–20 || box
|- style="text-align:center;background-color:#ffbbbb"
| 45 || May 20 || @ Red Sox || 0–9 || Lowe (7–1) || Ritchie (3–5) || || 2:20 || 32,461 || 24–21 || box
|- style="text-align:center;background-color:#bbffbb"
| 46 || May 21 || @ Red Sox || 8–3 || Wright (5–4) || Oliver (4–3) || || 2:48 || 31,772 || 25–21 || box
|- style="text-align:center;background-color:#bbffbb"
| 47 || May 22 || @ Red Sox || 2–0 || Garland (5–3) || Castillo (2–5) || Foulke (7) || 2:22 || 33,157 || 26–21 || box
|- style="text-align:center;background-color:#bbffbb"
| 48 || May 24 || Tigers || 12–1 || Buehrle (8–3) || Sparks (2–5) || || 2:22 || 14,597 || 27–21 || box
|- style="text-align:center;background-color:#bbffbb"
| 49 || May 25 || Tigers || 6–4 || Wunsch (1–0) || Greisinger (2–2) || Foulke (8) || 2:33 || 21,543 || 28–21 || box
|- style="text-align:center;background-color:#ffbbbb"
| 50 || May 26 || Tigers || 2–9 || Bernero (1–0) || Ritchie (3–6) || || 2:30 || 23,353 || 28–22 || box
|- style="text-align:center;background-color:#ffbbbb"
| 51 || May 27 || Yankees || 6–10 || Thurman (1–0) || Wright (5–5) || || 2:52 || 43,781 || 28–23 || box
|- style="text-align:center;background-color:#ffbbbb"
| 52 || May 28 || Yankees || 2–4 || Lilly (2–4) || Garland (5–4) || Rivera (16) || 3:00 || 27,859 || 28–24 || box
|- style="text-align:center;background-color:#ffbbbb"
| 53 || May 29 || Yankees || 3–6 || Karsay (2–2) || Foulke (0–3) || Rivera (17) || 3:10 || 27,572 || 28–25 || box
|- style="text-align:center;background-color:#ffbbbb"
| 54 || May 31 || @ Indians || 0–7 || Colón (7–3) || Glover (1–1) || || 2:44 || 33,756 || 28–26 || box

|- style="text-align:center;background-color:#ffbbbb"
| 55 || June 1 || @ Indians || 4–8 || Báez (5–4) || Ritchie (3–7) || || 2:59 || 37,707 || 28–27 || box
|- style="text-align:center;background-color:#ffbbbb"
| 56 || June 2 || @ Indians || 3–4 || Finley (4–6) || Wright (5–6) || Wickman (13) || 2:42 || 37,760 || 28–28 || box
|- style="text-align:center;background-color:#bbffbb"
| 57 || June 3 || Royals || 4–0 || Garland (6–4) || Affeldt (1–3) || || 2:41 || 15,168 || 29–28 || box
|- style="text-align:center;background-color:#ffbbbb"
| 58 || June 4 || Royals || 2–3 || Asencio (1–0) || Buehrle (8–4) || Hernández (9) || 2:42 || 13,063 || 29–29 || box
|- style="text-align:center;background-color:#bbffbb"
| 59 || June 5 || Royals || 6–1 || Glover (2–1) || Suppan (5–5) || || 2:33 || 12,167 || 30–29 || box
|- style="text-align:center;background-color:#ffbbbb"
| 60 || June 6 || Royals || 3–4 || May (1–3) || Ritchie (3–8) || Hernández (10) || 2:50 || 14,311 || 30–30 || box
|- style="text-align:center;background-color:#ffbbbb"
| 61 || June 7 || Expos || 3–4 || Armas (6–7) || Wright (5–7) || Tucker (3) || 2:55 || 22,481 || 30–31 || box
|- style="text-align:center;background-color:#ffbbbb"
| 62 || June 8 || Expos || 1–2 || Stewart (1–1) || Foulke (0–4) || Tucker (4) || 2:31 || 24,783 || 30–32 || box
|- style="text-align:center;background-color:#bbffbb"
| 63 || June 9 || Expos || 13–2 || Buehrle (9–4) || Pavano (3–8) || || 2:42 || 21,870 || 31–32 || box
|- style="text-align:center;background-color:#ffbbbb"
| 64 || June 10 || Mets || 1–3 || Astacio (7–2) || Glover (2–2) || Benítez (14) || 2:51 || 27,679 || 31–33 || box
|- style="text-align:center;background-color:#bbffbb"
| 65 || June 11 || Mets || 10–8 || Ritchie (4–8) || D'Amico (4–5) || Osuna (1) || 2:51 || 20,156 || 32–33 || box
|- style="text-align:center;background-color:#bbffbb"
| 66 || June 12 || Mets || 2–1 || Biddle (1–0) || Leiter (6–6) || Osuna (2) || 2:36 || 16,314 || 33–33 || box
|- style="text-align:center;background-color:#ffbbbb"
| 67 || June 14 || @ Cubs || 4–8 || Clement (5–4) || Garland (6–5) || || 2:46 || 38,051 || 33–34 || box
|- style="text-align:center;background-color:#ffbbbb"
| 68 || June 15 || @ Cubs || 3–7 || Lieber (5–4) || Buehrle (9–5) || || 2:57 || 38,860 || 33–35 || box
|- style="text-align:center;background-color:#bbffbb"
| 69 || June 16 || @ Cubs || 10–7 || Foulke (1–4) || Wood (6–5) || Osuna (3) || 3:09 || 38,742 || 34–35 || box
|- style="text-align:center;background-color:#bbffbb"
| 70 || June 18 || @ Phillies || 6 – 3 (12) || Osuna (4–1) || Coggin (0–2) || Biddle (1) || 4:16 || 17,424 || 35–35 || box
|- style="text-align:center;background-color:#ffbbbb"
| 71 || June 19 || @ Phillies || 3–4 || Plesac (2–2) || Biddle (1–1) || || 2:49 || 21,905 || 35–36 || box
|- style="text-align:center;background-color:#bbffbb"
| 72 || June 20 || @ Phillies || 6–1 || Buehrle (10–5) || Person (2–4) || || 2:49 || 22,132 || 36–36 || box
|- style="text-align:center;background-color:#ffbbbb"
| 73 || June 21 || @ Braves || 2–3 || Gryboski (1–1) || Ritchie (4–9) || Smoltz (23) || 2:37 || 35,102 || 36–37 || box
|- style="text-align:center;background-color:#ffbbbb"
| 74 || June 22 || @ Braves || 2–15 || Moss (4–2) || Glover (2–3) || || 2:57 || 47,276 || 36–38 || box
|- style="text-align:center;background-color:#ffbbbb"
| 75 || June 23 || @ Braves || 1–9 || Marquis (6–4) || Wright (5–8) || || 2:45 || 30,883 || 36–39 || box
|- style="text-align:center;background-color:#ffbbbb"
| 76 || June 24 || @ Twins || 4–5 || Hawkins (3–0) || Howry (0–1) || Guardado (22) || 2:46 || 24,102 || 36–40 || box
|- style="text-align:center;background-color:#bbffbb"
| 77 || June 25 || @ Twins || 15–7 || Buehrle (11–5) || Milton (8–6) || || 3:19 || 24,662 || 37–40 || box
|- style="text-align:center;background-color:#ffbbbb"
| 78 || June 26 || @ Twins || 5–6 || Lohse (7–5) || Ritchie (4–10) || Guardado (23) || 2:51 || 28,340 || 37–41 || box
|- style="text-align:center;background-color:#bbffbb"
| 79 || June 27 || @ Twins || 7–4 || Glover (3–3) || Reed (6–4) || Foulke (9) || 3:18 || 29,532 || 38–41 || box
|- style="text-align:center;background-color:#bbffbb"
| 80 || June 28 || Cubs || 13–9 || Ginter (1–0) || Borowski (2–4) || || 3:35 || 46,027 || 39–41 || box
|- style="text-align:center;background-color:#bbffbb"
| 81 || June 29 || Cubs || 5–4 || Garland (7–5) || Cruz (1–10) || Osuna (4) || 3:10 || 45,942 || 40–41 || box
|- style="text-align:center;background-color:#ffbbbb"
| 82 || June 30 || Cubs || 2–9 || Clement (6–5) || Buehrle (11–6) || || 2:42 || 45,351 || 40–42 || box

|- style="text-align:center;background-color:#bbffbb"
| 83 || July 2 || Tigers || 17–9 || Ritchie (5–10) || Bernero (2–4) || || 2:53 || 19,331 || 41–42 || box
|- style="text-align:center;background-color:#ffbbbb"
| 84 || July 3 || Tigers || 4–5 || Moehler (1–0) || Glover (3–4) || Paniagua (1) || 3:01 || 15,064 || 41–43 || box
|- style="text-align:center;background-color:#ffbbbb"
| 85 || July 4 || Tigers || 5–6 || Sparks (4–8) || Wunsch (1–1) || Acevedo (13) || 3:02 || 22,916 || 41–44 || box
|- style="text-align:center;background-color:#ffbbbb"
| 86 || July 5 || Indians || 2–4 || Báez (7–6) || Garland (7–6) || Wickman (19) || 3:09 || 29,085 || 41–45 || box
|- style="text-align:center;background-color:#bbffbb"
| 87 || July 6 || Indians || 7–3 || Buehrle (12–6) || Phillips (0–1) || Marte (1) || 2:38 || 25,016 || 42–45 || box
|- style="text-align:center;background-color:#ffbbbb"
| 88 || July 7 || Indians || 3–9 || Drese (8–6) || Ritchie (5–11) || || 2:55 || 22,104 || 42–46 || box
|- style="text-align:center;"
|colspan="11" style="background-color:#bbcaff" | All-Star Break: AL and NL tied 7–7 (11) at Miller Park
|- style="text-align:center;background-color:#bbffbb"
| 89 || July 11 || @ Tigers || 9–2 || Wright (6–8) || Sparks (4–9) || || 2:24 || 16,791 || 43–46 || box
|- style="text-align:center;background-color:#ffbbbb"
| 90 || July 12 || @ Tigers || 1–2 || Redman (5–8) || Ritchie (5–12) || Acevedo (15) || 2:38 || 26,121 || 43–47 || box
|- style="text-align:center;background-color:#ffbbbb"
| 91 || July 13 || @ Tigers || 3–5 || Rodney (1–2) || Buehrle (12–7) || Acevedo (16) || 2:37 || 13,189 || 43–48 || box
|- style="text-align:center;background-color:#ffbbbb"
| 92 || July 13 || @ Tigers || 1–3 || Maroth (2–3) || Biddle (1–2) || Henriquez (1) || 2:38 || 20,058 || 43–49 || box
|- style="text-align:center;background-color:#bbffbb"
| 93 || July 14 || @ Tigers || 6–4 || Garland (8–6) || Bernero (2–5) || Osuna (5) || 2:33 || 22,098 || 44–49 || box
|- style="text-align:center;background-color:#ffbbbb"
| 94 || July 15 || @ Indians || 1–7 || Phillips (1–1) || Glover (3–5) || || 2:53 || 30,025 || 44–50 || box
|- style="text-align:center;background-color:#bbffbb"
| 95 || July 16 || @ Indians || 5–4 || Osuna (5–1) || Wickman (0–3) || Marte (2) || 3:08 || 30,754 || 45–50 || box
|- style="text-align:center;background-color:#ffbbbb"
| 96 || July 17 || @ Royals || 6–8 || Suppan (8–7) || Ritchie (5–13) || Hernández (17) || 3:08 || 13,823 || 45–51 || box
|- style="text-align:center;background-color:#ffbbbb"
| 97 || July 18 || @ Royals || 3–5 || Byrd (13–6) || Marte (1–1) || || 2:06 || 15,522 || 45–52 || box
|- style="text-align:center;background-color:#ffbbbb"
| 98 || July 19 || @ Orioles || 4–10 || López (10–3) || Garland (8–7) || || 2:44 || 36,949 || 45–53 || box
|- style="text-align:center;background-color:#ffbbbb"
| 99 || July 20 || @ Orioles || 3 – 4 (14) || Bauer (5–4) || Howry (0–2) || || 4:54 || 39,257 || 45–54 || box
|- style="text-align:center;background-color:#bbffbb"
| 100 || July 21 || @ Orioles || 8–7 || Howry (1–2) || Roberts (5–3) || Osuna (6) || 3:12 || 35,337 || 46–54 || box
|- style="text-align:center;background-color:#ffbbbb"
| 101 || July 22 || Twins || 6–11 || Reed (8–5) || Ritchie (5–14) || || 3:33 || 32,352 || 46–55 || box
|- style="text-align:center;background-color:#bbffbb"
| 102 || July 23 || Twins || 8–7 || Buehrle (13–7) || Santana (4–2) || Osuna (7) || 3:08 || 22,665 || 47–55 || box
|- style="text-align:center;background-color:#ffbbbb"
| 103 || July 24 || Twins || 1–8 || Lohse (10–5) || Garland (8–8) || || 2:50 || 23,535 || 47–56 || box
|- style="text-align:center;background-color:#bbffbb"
| 104 || July 26 || Royals || 10–2 || Wright (7–8) || Sedlacek (1–1) || || 3:08 || 20,803 || 48–56 || box
|- style="text-align:center;background-color:#bbffbb"
| 105 || July 27 || Royals || 9–1 || Glover (4–5) || May (2–7) || || 2:41 || 28,931 || 49–56 || box
|- style="text-align:center;background-color:#bbffbb"
| 106 || July 28 || Royals || 4–2 || Howry (2–2) || Suppan (8–9) || Marte (3) || 2:36 || 29,534 || 50–56 || box
|- style="text-align:center;background-color:#bbffbb"
| 107 || July 30 || @ Twins || 3–0 || Buehrle (14–7) || Lohse (10–6) || || 2:08 || 27,391 || 51–56 || box
|- style="text-align:center;background-color:#ffbbbb"
| 108 || July 31 || @ Twins || 1 – 2 (10) || Romero (6–1) || Osuna (5–2) || || 3:02 || 29,478 || 51–57 || box

|- style="text-align:center;background-color:#ffbbbb"
| 109 || August 1 || @ Twins || 0–6 || Milton (13–7) || Wright (7–9) || || 2:25 || 26,270 || 51–58 || box
|- style="text-align:center;background-color:#bbffbb"
| 110 || August 2 || @ Devil Rays || 8 – 5 (12) || Wunsch (2–1) || Colomé (2–6) || Osuna (8) || 3:57 || 10,823 || 52–58 || box
|- style="text-align:center;background-color:#ffbbbb"
| 111 || August 3 || @ Devil Rays || 2–6 || Wilson (4–7) || Ritchie (5–15) || || 2:34 || 11,963 || 52–59 || box
|- style="text-align:center;background-color:#ffbbbb"
| 112 || August 4 || @ Devil Rays || 3–10 || Kennedy (7–8) || Buehrle (14–8) || || 2:41 || 11,809 || 52–60 || box
|- style="text-align:center;background-color:#bbffbb"
| 113 || August 5 || @ Devil Rays || 4–3 || Foulke (2–4) || Yan (5–6) || Marte (4) || 2:28 || 10,769 || 53–60 || box
|- style="text-align:center;background-color:#ffbbbb"
| 114 || August 6 || Angels || 2–11 || Washburn (14–3) || Wright (7–10) || Levine (5) || 3:05 || 17,706 || 53–61 || box
|- style="text-align:center;background-color:#bbffbb"
| 115 || August 7 || Angels || 7–6 || Osuna (6–2) || Donnelly (0–1) || || 3:33 || 14,253 || 54–61 || box
|- style="text-align:center;background-color:#bbffbb"
| 116 || August 8 || Angels || 3–2 || Parque (1–1) || Sele (8–8) || Marte (5) || 2:44 || 18,165 || 55–61 || box
|- style="text-align:center;background-color:#bbffbb"
| 117 || August 9 || Mariners || 10–2 || Buehrle (15–8) || García (12–8) || || 2:49 || 28,229 || 56–61 || box
|- style="text-align:center;background-color:#ffbbbb"
| 118 || August 10 || Mariners || 3–7 || Nelson (3–2) || Biddle (1–3) || || 3:34 || 29,766 || 56–62 || box
|- style="text-align:center;background-color:#bbffbb"
| 119 || August 11 || Mariners || 6–5 || Wright (8–10) || Baldwin (7–9) || Osuna (9) || 2:54 || 28,282 || 57–62 || box
|- style="text-align:center;background-color:#bbffbb"
| 120 || August 13 || @ Rangers || 12–3 || Glover (5–5) || Benoit (2–2) || || 3:05 || 25,657 || 58–62 || box
|- style="text-align:center;background-color:#ffbbbb"
| 121 || August 14 || @ Rangers || 6–11 || Valdez (6–9) || Parque (1–2) || || 3:11 || 21,450 || 58–63 || box
|- style="text-align:center;background-color:#ffbbbb"
| 122 || August 16 || @ Athletics || 0–1 || Lidle (6–9) || Buehrle (15–9) || Koch (31) || 2:16 || 22,622 || 58–64 || box
|- style="text-align:center;background-color:#ffbbbb"
| 123 || August 17 || @ Athletics || 2–9 || Mulder (14–7) || Garland (8–9) || || 2:48 || 40,658 || 58–65 || box
|- style="text-align:center;background-color:#ffbbbb"
| 124 || August 18 || @ Athletics || 4–7 || Zito (17–5) || Wright (8–11) || || 2:47 || 31,489 || 58–66 || box
|- style="text-align:center;background-color:#ffbbbb"
| 125 || August 19 || Twins || 3–7 || Radke (5–3) || Glover (5–6) || || 2:42 || 24,016 || 58–67 || box
|- style="text-align:center;background-color:#ffbbbb"
| 126 || August 20 || Twins || 0–5 || Lohse (11–7) || Parque (1–3) || || 2:22 || 16,192 || 58–68 || box
|- style="text-align:center;background-color:#bbffbb"
| 127 || August 21 || Twins || 10–1 || Buehrle (16–9) || Mays (2–5) || || 2:37 || 17,225 || 59–68 || box
|- style="text-align:center;background-color:#ffbbbb"
| 128 || August 23 || Devil Rays || 2–8 || Sturtze (3–13) || Garland (8–10) || || 2:40 || 27,988 || 59–69 || box
|- style="text-align:center;background-color:#bbffbb"
| 129 || August 24 || Devil Rays || 5–2 || Wright (9–11) || Wilson (6–9) || Marte (6) || 2:23 || 24,580 || 60–69 || box
|- style="text-align:center;background-color:#bbffbb"
| 130 || August 25 || Devil Rays || 8–3 || Glover (6–6) || Kennedy (7–9) || || 2:44 || 20,340 || 61–69 || box
|- style="text-align:center;background-color:#ffbbbb"
| 131 || August 26 || Blue Jays || 4–8 || Thurman (2–2) || Parque (1–4) || || 3:23 || 15,760 || 61–70 || box
|- style="text-align:center;background-color:#bbffbb"
| 132 || August 27 || Blue Jays || 8 – 4 (10) || Osuna (7–2) || Cassidy (0–4) || || 2:25 || 12,185 || 62–70 || box
|- style="text-align:center;background-color:#bbffbb"
| 133 || August 28 || Blue Jays || 8–0 || Garland (9–10) || Parris (5–5) || || 2:20 || 12,972 || 63–70 || box
|- style="text-align:center;background-color:#bbffbb"
| 134 || August 30 || @ Tigers || 4–3 || Wright (10–11) || Maroth (5–6) || Marte (7) || 2:36 || 16,857 || 64–70 || box
|- style="text-align:center;background-color:#bbffbb"
| 135 || August 31 || @ Tigers || 9–4 || Glover (7–6) || Sparks (8–14) || || 2:46 || 15,726 || 65–70 || box

|- style="text-align:center;background-color:#bbffbb"
| 136 || September 1 || @ Tigers || 7–0 || Buehrle (17–9) || Redman (8–13) || || 2:18 || 14,856 || 66–70 || box
|- style="text-align:center;background-color:#bbffbb"
| 137 || September 2 || @ Blue Jays || 5–3 || Garland (10–10) || Thurman (2–3) || Marte (8) || 2:58 || 18,373 || 67–70 || box
|- style="text-align:center;background-color:#bbffbb"
| 138 || September 3 || @ Blue Jays || 5–4 || Rauch (1–1) || Loaiza (7–8) || Marte (9) || 2:59 || 14,427 || 68–70 || box
|- style="text-align:center;background-color:#ffbbbb"
| 139 || September 4 || @ Blue Jays || 2–6 || Walker (8–4) || Wright (10–12) || || 2:39 || 21,122 || 68–71 || box
|- style="text-align:center;background-color:#ffbbbb"
| 140 || September 5 || Indians || 6–11 || Rodríguez (2–1) || Glover (7–7) || || 2:59 || 12,667 || 68–72 || box
|- style="text-align:center;background-color:#ffbbbb"
| 141 || September 6 || Indians || 7–9 || Burba (5–5) || Buehrle (17–10) || Báez (2) || 2:48 || 17,131 || 68–73 || box
|- style="text-align:center;background-color:#ffbbbb"
| 142 || September 7 || Indians || 2–4 || Sabathia (11–10) || Garland (10–11) || Wohlers (7) || 2:28 || 16,622 || 68–74 || box
|- style="text-align:center;background-color:#bbffbb"
| 143 || September 8 || Indians || 7–6 || Osuna (8–2) || Báez (10–11) || || 2:56 || 15,067 || 69–74 || box
|- style="text-align:center;background-color:#bbffbb"
| 144 || September 9 || @ Royals || 10–6 || Wright (11–12) || Byrd (15–11) || || 2:38 || 9,555 || 70–74 || box
|- style="text-align:center;background-color:#bbffbb"
| 145 || September 10 || @ Royals || 12–4 || Porzio (2–0) || Hernández (3–4) || Osuna (10) || 3:20 || 10,106 || 71–74 || box
|- style="text-align:center;background-color:#ffbbbb"
| 146 || September 11 || @ Royals || 6–9 || May (4–9) || Buehrle (17–11) || || 2:51 || 12,104 || 71–75 || box
|- style="text-align:center;background-color:#bbffbb"
| 147 || September 12 || @ Royals || 5–1 || Garland (11–11) || Asencio (3–6) || || 2:22 || 10,427 || 72–75 || box
|- style="text-align:center;background-color:#bbffbb"
| 148 || September 13 || @ Yankees || 13–2 || Biddle (2–3) || Mussina (16–10) || Osuna (11) || 3:22 || 45,935 || 73–75 || box
|- style="text-align:center;background-color:#bbffbb"
| 149 || September 14 || @ Yankees || 8–1 || Wright (12–12) || Clemens (12–6) || || 2:45 || 44,795 || 74–75 || box
|- style="text-align:center;background-color:#ffbbbb"
| 150 || September 15 || @ Yankees || 4 – 8 (6) || Pettitte (11–5) || Porzio (2–1) || || 2:01 || 39,587 || 74–76 || box
|- style="text-align:center;background-color:#bbffbb"
| 151 || September 17 || Royals || 6–1 || Buehrle (18–11) || Asencio (3–7) || Foulke (10) || 2:31 || 12,003 || 75–76 || box
|- style="text-align:center;background-color:#bbffbb"
| 152 || September 18 || Royals || 3–1 || Garland (12–11) || Suppan (8–16) || Marte (10) || 2:41 || 10,246 || 76–76 || box
|- style="text-align:center;background-color:#ffbbbb"
| 153 || September 19 || Royals || 1–2 || Byrd (17–11) || Biddle (2–4) || Hernández (26) || 2:31 || 10,354 || 76–77 || box
|- style="text-align:center;background-color:#bbffbb"
| 154 || September 20 || Twins || 10–2 || Wright (13–12) || Rincón (0–2) || || 2:24 || 16,128 || 77–77 || box
|- style="text-align:center;background-color:#bbffbb"
| 155 || September 21 || Twins || 14–4 || Rauch (2–1) || Radke (9–5) || || 2:53 || 20,645 || 78–77 || box
|- style="text-align:center;background-color:#bbffbb"
| 156 || September 22 || Twins || 8–2 || Buehrle (19–11) || Mays (4–8) || || 2:40 || 15,112 || 79–77 || box
|- style="text-align:center;background-color:#ffbbbb"
| 157 || September 24 || Red Sox || 2–4 || Fossum (5–4) || Garland (12–12) || Urbina (39) || 2:57 || 14,168 || 79–78 || box
|- style="text-align:center;background-color:#bbffbb"
| 158 || September 25 || Red Sox || 7–2 || Biddle (3–4) || Lowe (21–8) || || 2:19 || 13,102 || 80–78 || box
|- style="text-align:center;background-color:#bbffbb"
| 159 || September 26 || Red Sox || 3–2 || Wright (14–12) || Hancock (0–1) || Foulke (11) || 2:11 || 12,304 || 81–78 || box
|- style="text-align:center;background-color:#ffbbbb"
| 160 || September 27 || @ Twins || 1–3 || Fiore (10–3) || Glover (7–8) || Guardado (44) || 2:22 || 21,905 || 81–79 || box
|- style="text-align:center;background-color:#ffbbbb"
| 161 || September 28 || @ Twins || 2–3 || Hawkins (6–0) || Buehrle (19–12) || Guardado (45) || 2:35 || 32,072 || 81–80 || box
|- style="text-align:center;background-color:#ffbbbb"
| 162 || September 29 || @ Twins || 1–3 || Wells (2–1) || Porzio (2–2) || Romero (1) || 2:27 || 31,270 || 81–81 || box

Player stats

Batting 
Note: G = Games played; AB = At bats; R = Runs scored; H = Hits; 2B = Doubles; 3B = Triples; HR = Home runs; RBI = Runs batted in; BB = Base on balls; SO = Strikeouts; AVG = Batting average; SB = Stolen bases

Pitching 
Note: W = Wins; L = Losses; ERA = Earned run average; G = Games pitched; GS = Games started; SV = Saves; IP = Innings pitched; H = Hits allowed; R = Runs allowed; ER = Earned runs allowed; HR = Home runs allowed; BB = Walks allowed; K = Strikeouts

Farm system 

LEAGUE CHAMPIONS: Birmingham, Bristol

External links 
 2002 Chicago White Sox at Baseball Reference
 Chicago White Sox at Baseball Almanac

References 

Chicago White Sox seasons
Chicago White Sox season
White